Darnay is a given name and a surname. People with the name include:

Given name
 Darnay Scott (born 1972), American football wide receiver
 Darnay Holmes (born 1997), American football cornerback

Surname
 Arsen Darnay (born 1936), Hungarian-American science fiction writer
 Toni Darnay (1921 - 1983), American actress and dancer
 Christiane Darnay Neckaerts, Belgian beauty queen

Fictional characters
 Charles Darnay, fictional character in A Tale of Two Cities by Charles Dickens